Melito Irpino is a town and comune in the province of Avellino, in the Campania region of south-western Italy.

History
The remains of the ancient Melito were found in 1880. According to some theories, it could be a suburban village belonging to Aeclanum, but the prevailing theory suggests that it was the ancient village of Melae (or Melas). In Ab Urbe Condita (book XXIV, chapter X), Titus Livius wrote that Melae was destroyed in 215 BC by the troops of Claudius Marcellus and Quintus Fabius, during the Second Punic War.

Geography
The municipality is located in the northern area of its province, next to  that of Benevento. Crossed by the river Ufita, it borders with Apice, Ariano Irpino, Bonito and Grottaminarda. Its hamlets (frazioni) are the small villages of Cozza, Fontana del Bosco and Incoronata.

The town, included in the Roman Catholic Diocese of Ariano Irpino-Lacedonia, is 5 km far from Grottaminarda, 9 from Ariano Irpino, 30 from Benevento and 48 from Avellino. Nearest motorway exit is located in Grottaminarda, on the A16 Naples-Bari.

Main sights

The medieval old town, damaged by the 1962 Irpinia earthquake and then abandoned.
The medieval castle in the old town.

People
 (b. 1949), the first transatlantic hijacker
Tonino Sorrentino (b. 1985), footballer

References

External links

 Official website 
 Melito Irpino on comuni-italiani.it 

Cities and towns in Campania